The Open Mediterrania was a golf tournament on the European Tour, which was played at several different venues in Spain and France from 1990 to 1995. It had four different names in six years.

Major championship winners Ian Woosnam and José María Olazábal each claimed the Open Mediterrania title twice, while in 1995, future Ryder Cup star, Sergio García, became the then youngest player to make the cut in a European Tour event. The prize fund was £400,000 for each of the first four years before being cut to £300,000 for each of the final two years. In 1990 it was one of the highest on the European Tour, but by 1995 it was well below average.

Winners

Notes

References

External links
Coverage on the European Tour's official site

Former European Tour events
Defunct golf tournaments in France
Golf tournaments in Spain
Recurring sporting events established in 1990
Recurring sporting events disestablished in 1995
1990 establishments in Europe
1995 disestablishments in Europe